Pinolero is a colloquial term for a Nicaraguan. The term is used extensively in Nicaraguan Spanish. The plural of Pinolero is Pinoleros. Other colloquial references include Nica(s), Nicoya(s). Each of these terms are gender-neutral.

Etymology

The coined term has two possible, disputed origins. The first disputed origin is that the term is derived from the word pinol, a form of toasted ground corn that is the main ingredient for Pinolillo, a powdered form of the pinol which is used in a variety of local cuisine and beverage preparations. Historically, indigenous tribes in Nicaragua depended primarily on corn-based products as their primary food staple.

The second disputed origin is that the term comes from the Pinolero van-pickup truck hybrid  model produced by the state-run Nicaraguan Industry of Vehicles (known as Industrias Nicaragüenses de Vehículos, SA or INDEVESA in Spanish) during the 1970s.  These vehicles were a source of national pride because of the attempts to industrialize with state-run resources.

See also

Nica (toponym)
Culture of Nicaragua

References

P